The coat of arms of Baja California Sur was adopted in 1975, a year after it became a state as it was previously a territory.

Baja California Sur
Seals of country subdivisions